Michèle Moser (born 14 February 1979 as Michèle Knobel) is a Swiss curler and Olympic medalist. She received a silver medal at the 2006 Winter Olympics in Turin.

References

External links
 

Living people
Swiss female curlers
Olympic curlers of Switzerland
Curlers at the 2006 Winter Olympics
Olympic silver medalists for Switzerland
1979 births
Olympic medalists in curling
Medalists at the 2006 Winter Olympics
Swiss curling champions